Donald De La Haye Jr. (born December 2, 1996), also known online as Deestroying, is a Costa Rican-American YouTuber. 
He played college football at the University of Central Florida Knights football team. De La Haye is known for his videos demonstrating his kicking ability as well as his sports-related skits and vlogs talking about his life journey. He also made news while in college when the NCAA controversially banned him for profiting off his name and YouTube videos, which has sparked reform for student athlete compensation. He is also a partial owner of the FCF Glacier Boyz.

Early life and college career
De La Haye immigrated with his family from Costa Rica to the United States at the age of seven, spending the rest of his youth in Port St. Lucie, Florida. He played for the football team at the University of Central Florida as their kickoff specialist from 2015 to 2016. He also played wide receiver. De La Haye was a marketing major at UCF.

Loss of NCAA eligibility over YouTube channel
In 2017, De La Haye drew notable attention when the NCAA told him to delete or demonetize his YouTube Channel in order to stay on the football team, as the NCAA at that time forbid its athletes from profiting off their athletic ability aside from their scholarships. He was also not allowed to have his likeness or name in any of his videos if he decided to continue the channel. Faced with this dilemma, De La Haye ultimately chose to continue his channel normally, at the cost of his scholarship and NCAA eligibility. De La Haye sued UCF over this matter in July 2018, settling in November 2018 to finish his education there.

De La Haye's case has been one of several incidents in which NCAA athletes are barred from profiting off their names, images, and likenesses. Legislation has since been issued in a few states, including California and De La Haye's home state of Florida, in an attempt to allow student athletes to profit while in school.

YouTube career
While kicked off the UCF football team, De La Haye put more focus on his Deestroying youtube channel, which he started as a teenager in 2015. Evolving from skits on football stereotypes and kicker trick shot videos, the channel has also featured gaming videos, skits impersonating National Football League players such as Odell Beckham Jr., Tom Brady and JuJu Smith-Schuster, actual collaborations with players such as Smith-Schuster, Marquette King, Cam Newton, Antonio Brown, and Tyreek Hill and partnerships with the NFL and other sports organizations to create content. The channel has since surpassed 4.5 million subscribers after having just 94,000 when De La Haye left UCF.

De La Haye has also collaborated with other YouTube personalities such as Logan Paul, competing in the latter's "Challenger Games" in July 2019. This was his most popular video as of March 2021, eclipsing over 12 million views.

De La Haye has also attracted attention and collaborations outside of football such as his collaborations with other YouTubers like Flight and Cash Nasty, and continues to grow his channel.

Professional gridiron football career
After years of advocating for an NFL team to sign him through his videos, De La Haye was signed by the Toronto Argonauts of the Canadian Football League on May 19, 2019. The signing resulted in over 15,000 new followers on the Argonauts' official Instagram account. He appeared in both preseason games, making his one field goal attempt from a distance of 16 yards, and recording one punt for 46 yards. De La Haye was signed to the practice roster to begin the season. Due to limits on American players allowed on the roster, the Argonauts later placed De La Haye on the Suspended list in order to allow him to be free of team obligations and continue to upload videos consistently, which generates more income than being on the practice squad.

Recently, he has been making YouTube videos that display him practicing kicks, in the ultimate goal of making the NFL. In 2021 De La Haye posted a video in which he got invited to work out for the NFL Scouting Combine. De La Haye also won the Kohls Pro Combine kickoff competition in 2021.

Esports career 
In April 2022, De La Haye signed with FaZe Clan. He played in a flag football game with FaZe Clan in the 2022 Pro Bowl.

Other ventures 
De La Haye is also a co-owner of the FCF Glacier Boyz of Fan Controlled Football, along with Quavo and Richard Sherman.

References

External links

Official website

Living people
1996 births
21st-century African-American sportspeople
African-American players of American football
American football placekickers
American YouTubers
Canadian football placekickers
Costa Rican emigrants to the United States
FaZe Clan
People from Limón Province
People from Port St. Lucie, Florida
Players of American football from Florida
Social media influencers
Sports YouTubers
Toronto Argonauts players
UCF Knights football players
University of Central Florida alumni